Jean-Pierre Armengaud (born 17 June 1943) is a French music educator, musicologist, researcher and pianist.

Career
Armengaud was born in Clermont-Ferrand.

Armengaud is the author of several publications about Erik Satie, Jean Dubuffet, Henri Dutilleux, Edison Denisov, as well as numerous articles on French music, Russian music, musical creation, pianistic interpretation, and some thirty or so discographic publications (integrals of Satie, Debussy, Poulenc, Roussel).

Armengaud is director of the University of Évry festival "Les Friches musicales".

Publications
 Study "Pour un nouveau Projet Culturel et Patrimonial de L'Abbaye Royale de Fontevraud; éléments pour un contrat d'objectif", September 2004, 35 pages
 Publication of a communication on Critique et Interprétation d'Erik Satie in Cahiers du séminaire inter-arts Paris1-Paris 4, directed by par Marc Jimenez, 2005
 Preparation of proceedings of the symposium on pianistic interpretation, published in an issue of the Cahiers d'esthétique (Université de Paris 1) March 2008
 Co-organization of a symposium on Robert Schumann Nouveaux regards, Nouvelles écoutes at the University of Évry, 7 and 8 December 2006; realisation of a communication on Schumann à travers l'autobiographie inédite de Jean-Bonaventure Laurens, with an unpublished portrait of Robert Schumann
 Publication of a text and a double CD devoted to the piano work of Albert Roussel, including the analysis and execution of six unpublished works, Mandala-Harmonia Mundi, November 2006
 Publication of an article on "L'œuvre d'Henri Dutilleux" in La Revue d'Histoire de la Touraine, March 2007, translated into Italian for the magazine Finnegans, (Lombardy), published in November 2007
 Masterclass for concertists and musicologists at Goldsmiths, University of London, Warsaw Academy of Music, Trieste and Rovigo conservatories, Beijin Central Conservatory, The Academy of Music of Tirana
 Numerous conferences/concerts for Universities of the Third Age

Recordings (selection)
 Quintet version of La création du monde by Darius Milhaud
 Fantasy for violin and piano and Quatuor pour la fin du temps by Olivier Messiaen
 CD of unedited transcriptions by Maurice Ravel
 CD-book of late works for piano by Robert Schumann, written at the time of the meeting with Jean-Joseph Bonaventure Laurens

References

External links
 Personal website
 Jean-Pierre Armangaud on Pianobleu.com
 Jean-Pierre Armangaud on France Culture
 Jean-Pierre Armangaud on Université Évry Val d'Essonne

1943 births
20th-century French musicologists
21st-century French male classical pianists
21st-century French musicologists
École Normale de Musique de Paris alumni
Living people
Writers from Clermont-Ferrand
Musicians from Clermont-Ferrand